Carole Farley is an American soprano and a principal singer at the Metropolitan Opera.

Early life and education
Farley was born in Le Mars, Iowa.  She graduated from Indiana University with a bachelor's degree in music. She spent the following academic year on a Fulbright scholarship at the Hochschule für Musik in Munich. She is married to conductor José Serebrier.

Career
In 1975 Farley made her debut with the Metropolitan Opera in a matinee performance as Mimi in La bohème. In 1977 she sang the title role in the Metropolitan Opera's premiere of Lulu. In the late 1970s and 1980s she was known for singing demanding roles such as Lulu and the solo role in Poulenc's La voix humaine.

Farley has been collaborating in recent years with contemporary American classical composers including Ned Rorem, William Bolcom, and Lowell Liebermann on multiple concert and recording projects.

Discography and videography
 DVD. Poulenc's La voix humaine and Menotti's The Telephone.  Scottish Chamber Orchestra, dir. José Serebrier. Decca Music Group 1992, licensed to VAI 2006.

References

External links 

American operatic sopranos
Living people
Year of birth missing (living people)
People from Le Mars, Iowa
Indiana University alumni
Singers from Iowa
University of Music and Performing Arts Munich alumni
20th-century American women opera singers
21st-century American women opera singers
Classical musicians from Iowa